The 2020 Super2 Series was an Australian motor racing competition for Supercars, which was staged as a support series to the 2020 Supercars Championship. It was the twenty-first running of the Supercars Development Series, the second tier of competition in Supercars racing.

Entries 
The following teams and drivers competed in the 2020 championship:

 – Eligible for the A$100,000 'rookie class' prize pool.

Team changes 

 Brema Group Racing made its début in the series, acquiring an ex-Lucas Dumbrell Motorsport VF Commodore.
 Anderson Motorsport made their début in the series, acquiring an ex-Walkinshaw Andretti United VF Commodore.
 Eggleston Motorsport scaled back their commitment to the series from three cars to two.  
Triple Eight Race Engineering scaled back its commitment to the series from two cars to one. 
Kostecki Brothers Racing returned to the series after withdrawing from final three rounds in 2019. 
Matt Chahda Motorsport expanded its operations to enter a second car at the Bathurst round.
 Garry Rogers Motorsport withdrew from the series after withdrawing from the Supercars Championship, while Matt Stone Racing withdrew from the series to focus on the Supercars Championship.

Driver changes 

 Will Brown moved from Eggleston Motorsport to Image Racing. The team is supported by Erebus Motorsport and Brown is expected to be promoted to Erebus' Supercars Championship in 2021. 
Thomas Randle moved from Tickford Racing to MW Motorsport.
Tyler Everingham moved from MW Motorsport to Anderson Motorsport. He missed the first round due to an incident in the Bathurst 12 Hour.
Kurt Kostecki returned to Kostecki Brothers Racing after spending a single year with Triple Eight Race Engineering.
Brodie Kostecki returned to the series with Eggleston Motorsport, after withdrawing from the last four rounds in 2019.
2019 Super 3 Series winner Broc Feeney graduated to the series with Tickford Racing.
 Super3 Series drivers Zak Best & Jayden Ojeda Graduated to the series with MW Motorsport.
Josh Fife graduated to the series with Brad Jones Racing. 
Reigning Australian Formula Ford champion Angelo Mouzouris joined the series with Triple Eight Race Engineering.
 Toyota 86 Series driver Zane Morse joined the series with Brema Group Racing.
Matt McLean made his series debut at Bathurst with Matt Chahda Motorsport
 Bryce Fullwood Graduated to the Supercars Championship with Walkinshaw Andretti United
Jack Smith graduated to the Supercars Championship with Brad Jones Racing
Jake Kostecki and Zane Goddard graduated to the Supercars Championship, sharing the Matt Stone Racing Superlite entry.
Brenton Grove and Adam Marjoram will not drive in the series in 2020.

Calendar 
The calendar for the 2020 championship was expected to consist of five rounds, but only three were run as the COVID-19 pandemic disrupted the running of the championship.

Calendar changes 

 The original calendar removed the Ipswich, Newcastle and Perth rounds with Sydney Motorsport Park and Symmons Plains reinstated, having last being in the series in 2017 and 2018 respectively. Due to the COVID-19 pandemic, a revised calendar resulted in the Symmons Plains and The Bend Motorsport Park rounds being cancelled.
 The Bathurst 250 km race was split into two races of 125 km. The change was made as the mandatory refuelling in pit stops proved to be problematic in 2019.

Rule changes

Sporting regulations 

 The series was to have seen an increase in the prize money awarded, with the champion to be given $400,000 as a way to secure funding into the Supercars Championship. A "Rookie" class aimed at drivers under the age of 25 was planned, with the winner to be awarded $100,000 to secure a second year in the series. This was done to help young drivers into the Supercars Championship as part of the Junior Development Program. As a result the COVID-19 pandemic, both were shelved.

Results and standings

Season summary

Points system
Points were awarded in each race as follows.

Drivers' championship

References 

Super2